In geometry, the sphenomegacorona is one of the Johnson solids. It is one of the elementary Johnson solids that do not arise from "cut and paste" manipulations of the Platonic and Archimedean solids.

Johnson uses the prefix spheno- to refer to a wedge-like complex formed by two adjacent lunes, a lune being a square with equilateral triangles attached on opposite sides. Likewise, the suffix -megacorona refers to a crownlike complex of 12 triangles, contrasted with the smaller triangular complex that makes the sphenocorona. Joining both complexes together results in the sphenomegacorona.

Cartesian coordinates 
Let k ≈ 0.59463 be the smallest positive root of the polynomial

Then, Cartesian coordinates of a sphenomegacorona with edge length 2 are given by the union of the orbits of the points

under the action of the group generated by reflections about the xz-plane and the yz-plane.

We may then calculate the surface area of a sphenomegacorona of edge length a as

and its volume as

References

External links
 

Johnson solids